James John Rhoades (December 5, 1941 – October 18, 2008) was a Republican member of the Pennsylvania State Senate who represented the 29th District from 1980 until his death.

Biography
Rhoades graduated from East Stroudsburg University of Pennsylvania in 1963 with a bachelor's degree in education and was a member of Sigma Pi fraternity.  He later earned a master's degree in education from Lehigh University in 1966. After graduation, Rhoades started as a teacher and football coach at the Pottsville Area School District and Mahanoy Area School District.

After seven years of teaching, Rhoades was appointed as the principal of the Mahanoy Area Intermediate School. He served as principal for ten years before his election to the State Senate.

Rhoades died in the hospital on October 18, 2008, a day after being injured in an automobile accident near Brodheadsville, Pennsylvania, in Monroe County. He had been en route to a Pleasant Valley High School football game. His wife, Mary, was also injured in the crash. Thomas Senavitis was arrested for allegedly driving under the influence and causing the accident with a blood alcohol level of 0.355%, over 4 times the Pennsylvania state limit of 0.08%. Senavitis was convicted of DUI but acquitted on charges of vehicular homicide in March, 2010.

Career
Rhoades was defeated for a seat in the Pennsylvania House of Representatives in 1978. However, in 1980, he won a seat in the Pennsylvania State Senate, defeating Democratic incumbent Joseph Gurzenda.

As a former educator, Rhoades had an interest in education issues and ultimately became Chairman of the Senate Education Committee. As chairman of that committee, Rhoades had influence over almost all education related laws, including the Pennsylvania Safe Schools Act and the Head Start Supplemental Assistance Program.

He also served on the Appropriations, Transportation, Law and Justice, and Environmental Resources and Energy committees.

At the time of Rhoades' death, he was running for his eighth term in the State Senate, making him second behind Stewart Greenleaf on the list of the longest serving senators. With absentee ballots having already been mailed in the state, the county could not remove Rhoades' name from the ballot.

Rhoades was posthumously re-elected with 64% of the vote, meaning that a special election would be held for his seat. In a special election held on March 3, 2009, Republican state Representative Dave Argall was elected to Rhoades' seat over his Democratic opponent, Schuylkill County Clerk of Courts Steven Lukach, by a margin of 62% to 38%.

Family
Rhoades was the cousin of Bishop Kevin C. Rhoades, the former bishop of the Roman Catholic Diocese of Harrisburg and the current bishop of the Roman Catholic Diocese of Fort Wayne-South Bend. His son Mike is the current head coach of the VCU men's basketball team and the former head coach at Rice University.

References

External links
Pennsylvania Senate - James J. Rhoades official PA Senate website (archived)
 official Party website (archived)
Biography, voting record, and interest group ratings at Project Vote Smart
Follow the Money - James J. Rhoades
2008 2006 2004 2000 campaign contributions

1941 births
2008 deaths
20th-century American educators
20th-century American politicians
21st-century American politicians
Lehigh University alumni
Republican Party Pennsylvania state senators
People from Schuylkill County, Pennsylvania
Politicians elected posthumously
Politicians from Waterbury, Connecticut
Road incident deaths in Pennsylvania
Schoolteachers from Pennsylvania